John J. H. "Joe" Schwarz (born November 15, 1937), is an American physician and independent politician from Michigan, who was elected to the United States House of Representatives in 2004 as a moderate Republican. He represented Michigan's 7th congressional district from January 2005 to January 2007.

Early life and career
Schwarz was born and raised in Battle Creek, Michigan, after his family moved there in 1935 so his father could work as a physician in the Veterans Administration Hospital. He has two older siblings, Frank and Janet. He attended Fremont Elementary School, W.K. Kellogg Junior High School, and graduated from Battle Creek Central High School. He played on the baseball, swimming and football teams at B.C. Central. In 1959, he received a B.A. in History from the University of Michigan, Ann Arbor, where he played on the 1956 reserve football team as a center.

He returned, with his new family, to Battle Creek in 1974, and has been a practicing physician in Battle Creek since that time. He currently sees patients at the Family Health Center in Battle Creek, a federally qualified health center. He is a Fellow of the American College of Surgeons. His first wife, Anne, died in 1990, and he is divorced from his second wife. He has one daughter from his first marriage.

Political career
In 2006, Schwarz voted against the Federal Marriage Amendment, which would have banned every state from legally recognizing same-sex marriage. Schwarz is considered to be a moderate Republican who supports abortion rights and favors embryonic stem cell research.

Post-congressional life
On the state level, Schwarz was appointed to Gov. Jennifer Granholm's Emergency Financial Advisory Panel, led by former Michigan governors Milliken (R) and Blanchard (D). On the national level, Schwarz was appointed by Secretary of Defense Robert Gates to serve on the independent panel to investigate the conditions at Walter Reed Army Hospital in suburban Washington, DC. Schwarz was reappointed to the Altarum Institute Board of Trustees, a position he held prior to his congressional service, in February 2007. Altarum Institute is a nonprofit health policy research institute based in Ann Arbor, Michigan. He also accepted a teaching position at the University of Michigan's Gerald R. Ford School of Public Policy, which began in fall 2007.

In 2010, Schwarz considered running for governor of Michigan as an independent in that year's election. However, on June 2, 2010, he announced he would not run due to fundraising issues.

, Schwarz is a member of the Michigan State Medical Society's board of directors.

On June 16, 2014, Schwarz signed a brief in support of same-sex marriage.

Schwarz currently serves as a trustee for Olivet College. Schwarz also served as campaign chair for the college's previous capital campaign during 2007-2009 academic years for Olivet College.

Electoral history
 2006 Race for the U.S. House of Representatives, 7th District
 Tim Walberg (R), 50%
 Sharon Renier (D), 46%
 David Horn (UST), 1%
 Robert Hutchinson (L), 2%
 Joe Schwarz, 1% (Write-in candidate)
 2006 Race for the U.S. House of Representatives, 7th District – Republican Primary
 Tim Walberg (R), 53%
 Joe Schwarz (R) (inc.), 47%
 2004 Race for the U.S. House of Representatives, 7th District
 Joe Schwarz (R), 58%
 Sharon Renier (D), 36%
 2004 Race for the U.S. House of Representatives, 7th District – Republican Primary
 Joe Schwarz (R), 28%
 Brad Smith (R), 22%
 Tim Walberg (R), 18%
 Clark Bisbee (R), 14%
 Gene DeRossett (R), 11%
 Paul DeWeese (R), 7%
 2002 Race for Governor – Republican Primary
 Dick Posthumus (R), 81%
 Joe Schwarz (R), 19%

References

External links
 
 
 Voting record maintained by the Washington Post

1937 births
20th-century American physicians
20th-century American politicians
21st-century American politicians
American otolaryngologists
Gerald R. Ford School of Public Policy faculty
Living people
Mayors of places in Michigan
Michigan Independents
Michigan Wolverines football players
Michigan state senators
People from Battle Creek, Michigan
Republican Party members of the United States House of Representatives from Michigan
United States Navy Medical Corps officers
University of Michigan faculty
Faculty
Military personnel from Michigan